Vilapangalkkappuram (Beyond the Wail) is a Malayalam film scripted and directed by T. V. Chandran in 2008. The film is based on the aftermath of the 2002 Gujarat riots of 2002. It was the second movie in the trilogy based on the riots by the director with the first one being Kathavasheshan and the third and final one being Bhoomiyude Avakashikal. The main female lead Priyanka won the Kerala State Film Award for Best Actress for her performance in this film.

Plot
Zahira (Priyanka) lives happily with her parents and younger sister in Ahmedabad, until a group of communalists wreaks havoc. After being gang raped, she barely manages to escape from the criminals before they set her ablaze. In a fit of panic, she hides inside a lorry but it takes Zahira to her father's home-town in Kozhikode, Kerala.

As Zahira gradually recovers from her pathetic state, with the help of Dr. Mary Varghese (Suhasini) and Dr. Gopinath (Biju Menon), she has to face a new crisis. She soon realizes that in our society, most humans categorize themselves only on the basis of religions and castes.

Zahira learns more about the real world, where beastly minds are vying to pounce upon a helpless woman. Even during those tumultuous times, she comes across genuine souls like Gopalettan (Thilakan), who takes care of her like a daughter.

Cast 
 Priyanka as Zahira
 Biju Menon as Dr. Gopinath
 Suhasini Maniratnam as Dr. Mary Varghese
 M. R. Gopakumar as Yusuf Ali (Zahira's father)
 V. K. Sreeraman as Salim Bhai
 Sudheesh as Khadar Kutty
 Thilakan as Gopalan
 Indrans
 Irshad
 Nandhu
 Kozhikode Narayanan Nair
 Nilambur Ayisha
 Kozhikode Shantha Devi
 Praveena
 Zeenath

Soundtrack
"Mullulla Murikkinmel" - Manjari, M. Jayachandran (lyrics: Gireesh Pithenchery)

External links 
 
 OneIndia article
 Sify.com review

2000s Malayalam-language films
Films scored by M. Jayachandran
Films set in 2002
2002 Gujarat riots
Films about religious violence in India
Films shot in Ahmedabad
Films shot in Kozhikode
Films directed by T. V. Chandran